Appleford School is a private specialist dyslexia school near Shrewton in Wiltshire, England.

History
Appleford was founded in 1988 by Dr Peter Gardner, a Chartered Educational Psychologist, a Chartered Forensic Psychologist and a Chartered Counselling Psychologist of the British Psychological Society, and Gerald Trump. Zoë Wanamaker, CBE later became Patron of Appleford. It was originally a prep school for pupils aged 7 to 13, and later expanded to take pupils up to 18 years old, studying BTECs, GCSEs, AS and A-levels.

Appleford specialises in teaching pupils with dyslexia, dyscalculia and dyspraxia. The school is accredited by the Council for the Registration of Schools Teaching Dyslexic Pupils (CReSTeD).

In 2012 and 2015, the Independent Schools Inspectorate rated the school "excellent" in all areas, and in 2018 all standards were met in the Regulatory Compliance inspection. In the Independent School Awards, Appleford was shortlisted in 2014 and 2015 in two categories, won the Award for Outstanding Sport (Small School) in 2018, and was shortlisted in 2019 for the Outstanding Provision for Learning Support Award.  In 2021 Appleford won the Bronze Lockdown Hero Award for Learner and Community Support in the Pearson National Teaching Awards, and was shortlisted for the Small Independent School of the Year in the Independent School of the Year Awards.

General information
Appleford takes a whole-school approach to dyslexia using research-based multi-sensory programmes and resources. It has small classes of 8 to 12 pupils with high levels of LSA support. It employs a range of staff, including specialist teachers and therapists. The school gives access to qualifications including GCSEs (with options at Year 8), A-levels, and BTEC Vocational and Functional Skills Certificates. It takes pupils on a day, week or full board basis.

Former pupils are known as Old Applefordians. They are invited to attend an annual reunion at the school each year, known as 'Old Applefordians' Day'.

Houses
The school is split into five houses: Maddington House (Prep School boy boarders), Willow House (Prep School girl boarders), Elm House (Senior boy boarders), The Beeches (Senior girl boarders) and Oak House (day pupils). All boarding houses are on the main school site, except Maddington House which is in the nearby village of Shrewton.

References

External links
 

Private schools in Wiltshire
Educational institutions established in 1988
1988 establishments in England
Special schools in Wiltshire